Arne Christian Gunneng (1 December 1914 – 8 March 1989) was a Norwegian diplomat.

He was born in Kristiania, and was a cand.jur. by education. He started working for the Norwegian Ministry of Foreign Affairs in 1945, and served as the Norwegian ambassador to Canada from 1955 to 1959 before being permanent under-secretary of state in the Ministry of Foreign Affairs from 1959 to 1961. He served as the Norwegian ambassador to Sweden from 1961 to 1966, the United States from 1966 to 1963, Italy from 1973 to 1978 and the Netherlands from 1978 to 1983.

References

1914 births
1989 deaths
Diplomats from Oslo
Ambassadors of Norway to Canada
Ambassadors of Norway to Sweden
Ambassadors of Norway to the United States
Ambassadors of Norway to Italy
Ambassadors of Norway to the Netherlands